Nedu Neer is a 2022 Indian Tamil-language drama film directed by K. K. Padmanabhan and starring Raj Krish, Indhuja and Sathya Murugan in the lead roles. It was released on 23 December 2022.

Cast
Raj Krish
Indhuja
Sathya Murugan
S. K. Minnalraja
Madurai Mohan

Production
The first look of the film was released at an event in November 2020 attended by chief guest, Jaguar Thangam.

Reception
The film was released on 23 December 2022 across Tamil Nadu. A reviewer from the Madurai-based Thinaboomi newspaper gave the film a positive review, though cited that "it was a quiet, pleasant watch". A reviewer from Dina Thanthi noted that the director had created a good film. Critic Malini Mannath noted it was "Nedu Neer is a promising piece of work from a debutant maker and his team of freshers."

References

2022 films
2020s Tamil-language films